Hampton Ponds State Park is a Massachusetts state park located in the northeast corner of the city of Westfield. The park offers water-based activities including swimming, motorized and non-motorized boating, and fishing plus facilities for picnicking. The park is managed by the Department of Conservation and Recreation.

References

External links
Hampton Ponds State Park Department of Conservation and Recreation

State parks of Massachusetts
Parks in Hampden County, Massachusetts
Westfield, Massachusetts